Inspiration Mars Foundation was an American nonprofit organization founded by Dennis Tito that in 2013 proposed to launch a crewed mission to flyby Mars in January 2018, or 2021 if they missed the first synodic opportunity in 2018.

Their website became defunct by late 2015. They are no longer operating.

Plans
On 27 February 2013, the Inspiration Mars Foundation held a press conference in the National Press Club. They announce plans to procure space hardware, launch vehicle services, and select a two-person married couple as crew, and then raise the funding necessary to launch a mission to Mars in 2018. Dennis Tito said he would fund the foundation with $100 million for the first years of operation.

At the 2013 conference, however, Dennis Tito admitted that his plan was impossible without investment from NASA and the use of NASA spacecraft. NASA, however, was not willing to become a partner.

Funding
Tito said he would fund the foundation's cost for the first two years and planned to raise funds from industry and individuals for the mission.

But in testimony before Congress in November 2013, Tito said that he expected private donors would only provide around $300 million, leaving the need for an additional investment of $700 million from the US government. NASA responded that while they were willing to share technical and programmatic expertise, they would not commit to sharing expenses with the organization. The foundation's funding model, dependent on a non-existent partner, never took form.

In March 2014, SpaceX said that they also had been contacted by Inspiration Mars, but that accommodating such requirements would require some additional work and that such work was not the current focus of SpaceX.

Mission trajectory as proposed

They proposed a free return trajectory to allow the spacecraft to use the smallest possible amount of propellant to flyby Mars and return to Earth. They stated that the January 2018 launch window offered a rare orbit opportunity to travel to Mars and return to Earth in 501 days.

Their stated backup plan involved a mission beginning in 2021 but it would be 88 days longer. They stated it would require both a flyby of Venus and Mars. The flight would take the spacecraft within 800 kilometres of the surface of Venus, using the planet for a gravity assist to speed the travel to Mars.

According to a paper written by Tito, "the mission would require no maneuvers except small course corrections after a trans-Martian injection burn, [and] would allow no aborts. ... [It will] use low Earth orbit launch and crewed-spacecraft technology, outfitted for the long duration of a flight to Mars." They speculated that when the spacecraft returned to Earth it would reenter the atmosphere at 50 000 km per hour (ca 13.9 km/s), faster than any previous return.

Student design competition
During the 16th Annual International Mars Society Convention in 2013, the Mars Society announced an international engineering competition for student teams to propose designs for the architecture of the mission. The contest was open to university engineering student teams. The design contest took place on 9 August 2014, and was won by an international team from Purdue University in US and Keio University in Japan.

Criticism
A spokesman for NASA stated in February 2013 that "Inspiration Mars's proposed schedule is a significant challenge due to life support systems, space radiation response, habitats and the human psychology of being in a small spacecraft for over 500 days", but that "we remain open to further collaboration as their proposal and plans for a later mission develop".

John Logsdon, professor emeritus at George Washington University's Space Policy Institute, said the timeline was "totally implausible" for a mission to be launched in 2018, although the"Plan B" mission might be possible "if the stars align".

Their website became defunct in late 2015.

See also

  
 
 
  
 List of crewed Mars mission plans

References

External links 

 Official website, now defunct
 Flickr: Inspiration Mars photo stream
 Earth/Mars/IM capsule 501-day mission orbital position animation, Inspiration Mars Foundation, February 2013.
 Feasibility Analysis
 Introductory Press Conference, 27 February 2013
 Inspiration Mars: 29th National Space Symposium:  panel discussion, Dennis Tito, Taber MacCallum, Jonathan Clark, and Jane Poynter, Colorado Springs, Colorado, 11 April 2013.
Newer concept

Human spaceflight
Exploration of Mars
Scientific research foundations in the United States
Dennis Tito
Missions to Mars
Human missions to Mars
Missions to Venus
Colonization of Mars
Proposed space probes
2013 establishments in Delaware